Rajesh Balia (born 3 March 1946) is an Indian Judge and former Chief Justice of the Patna High Court.

Career
Balia was born in 1946 in a business family. His father, Late Manak Lal Sa Balia was a businessman and influenced by the Gandhian Movement. Balia passed B.Com. and LL.B. and started practice  on 9 April 1967 in the Rajasthan High Court. He was appointed an Additional Judge of Rajasthan High Court on 21 October 1991. Thereafter he became permanent Judge in 1992 of the same High Court. He was transferred to Gujarat High Court and also became the Acting Chief Justice of Rajasthan High Court from 12 November 2007 to 4 January 2008. Justice Balia was elevated in the post of Chief Justice of Patna High Court on 5 January 2008 and retired on 3 March 2008. After the retirement he was appointed Chairman of Rajasthan Human Rights Commission on 31 August 2011.

References

1946 births
Living people
Rajasthani people
Indian judges
Chief Justices of the Patna High Court
Judges of the Gujarat High Court
Judges of the Rajasthan High Court
21st-century Indian lawyers
21st-century Indian judges